China Avutapalli is a village in Krishna district of the Indian state of Andhra Pradesh. It is located in Gannavaram mandal of Nuzvid revenue division. It is located 4 km from the Vijayawada Airport.

Transport

Peda Avutapalli railway station is the nearest Railway station.

Vijayawada International Airport is the nearest Airport

References

Villages in Krishna district